Emily Vontz (born 15 October 2000) is a German politician of the Social Democratic Party (SPD) who has been serving as a Member of the German Bundestag from Saarland since January 2023. She is the youngest member of the Bundestag and the first German MP to be born in the 2000s.

References

See also 

 List of members of the 20th Bundestag

2000 births
Living people
21st-century German politicians
21st-century German women politicians
Female members of the Bundestag
Members of the Bundestag for Saarland
Members of the Bundestag 2021–2025
Members of the Bundestag for the Social Democratic Party of Germany

German Catholics
People from Merzig-Wadern